Zinc Alloy and the Hidden Riders of Tomorrow is an album by English rock band T. Rex, the ninth since Tyrannosaurus Rex's debut LP. It was released in March 1974 on the T.Rex record label, distributed by EMI. It was the first and only album to be released under the moniker "Marc Bolan & T. Rex". 

Unlike many of T. Rex's previous albums, it was not released domestically in North America; instead, the record company released the U.S.-only Light of Love in August of the same year, featuring three tracks from Zinc Alloy while the remainder songs would appear on the band's next album, Bolan's Zip Gun.

Zinc Alloy was met with bemusement by the listening public. It reportedly confused listeners and divided the band's fanbase at the time, while critical reception was universally negative. Critical re-evaluation has been slightly more favourable, but it remains an oddity in the T. Rex canon due to its style incorporating funk and R&B influences. The album peaked at number 12 in the UK Albums chart.

Background and recording 
Singer, guitarist, songwriter Marc Bolan was one of the first English artists to record in Germany, at Musicland Studios in Munich; most basic recordings were done in 1973 between February and June. Bolan was unsatisfied with what he perceived as insufficient reception to the single "20th Century Boy"(which reached #3 position in March 1973) and eager to experiment instrumentally in ways the band's previous highly structured pop-oriented work had not allowed. His two main influences were his relationship with musician and songwriter Gloria Jones, and an affection for the black radio station music he heard while touring the US.
The album was mixed after the band's return from their US tour, at the end of which drummer Bill Legend quit. The mixing was difficult as Bolan was heavy on drugs. He wanted to keep control and didn't listen to any Visconti's advice. This was the last time that Visconti worked with the band. 

The T. Rex band was expanded for this release, incorporating second guitarist, Jack Green, session player B.J. Cole on pedal steel, and backing vocalists 'The Cosmic Choir', a soul duo composed of Gloria Jones and Sister Pat Hall, sometimes augmented by Gloria's brother "Big" Richard Jones.

Music
Journalist Alexis Petridis wrote that the album features a variety of styles including "the funky clavinet, the Jerry Lee Lewis piano, the backing vocals of his new partner Gloria Jones, the strings, the horns and the trebly, distorted guitar on which Bolan would fire off extravagant, Hendrixesque solo." AllMusic described "The Avengers (Superbad)"", "Interstellar Soul" and "Liquid Gang" as "solid James Brown drive".

Release 
The sleeve only had to show the subtitle A Creamed Cage in August but EMI decided to add a banner with the name of the band before printing. The album was released five weeks after the end of the UK Tour. The band had asked that the initial pressings were a multi-layered triple gatefold sleeve, a latticework image of the current cover featuring singer Marc Bolan's face in a pale gold surround, meant to fold-out into the 'Creamed Cage' of the subtitle. It peaked at number twelve in the UK Albums chart and the lead single, "Teenage Dream", reached No. 13 in the singles chart.

At the time of the UK release, Bolan's U.S. label Reprise had dropped him and he was struggling to find another U.S. label to sign him. When he finally got a deal with Casablanca Records he had recorded much new material, which the new record company decided to release along with a couple of tracks from Zinc Alloy as the Light of Love album in September 1974; thus, neither Zinc Alloy nor Bolan's Zip Gun were issued in the U.S. in the 1970s.

A companion release to the later Demon Records reissue, entitled Change (The Alternate Zinc Alloy), was released in 1995 and contained alternative versions, studio rough mixes, and demos of the main album and bonus tracks. The two were combined for a 2CD edition, which was released by Edsel and Rhino Records in 2002. Another reissue with rarities was issued in 2014.

Critical reception 
{{Album ratings
| rev1 = AllMusic
| rev1score = 
| rev2 = Pitchfork
| rev2score = 5.8/10<ref>{{cite web |url=http://pitchfork.com/reviews/albums/11845-the-slider-zinc-alloy-and-the-hidden-riders-of-tomorrow-dandy-in-the-underworld-the-t-rex-wax-co-singles-as-and-bs-1972-77/ |title=T. Rex: The Slider / Zinc Alloy and the Hidden Riders of Tomorrow / Dandy in the Underworld / The T. Rex Wax Co. Singles: A's and B's 1972–77 |last=Deusner |first=Stephen M. |website=Pitchfork |access-date=8 February 2015}}</ref>
| rev3 = Uncut| rev3score = 7/10
}}Zinc Alloy was poorly received upon release, with  "universally hostile" reviews.  The British press slammed T. Rex for copying the title of the album on Bowie's The Rise and Fall of Ziggy Stardust and the Spiders from Mars, even though Bolan had spoken of releasing work under the pseudonym "Zinc Alloy" during the mid-1960s.

Retrospective reviews have been more favourable. AllMusic praised the song "You've Got to Jive to Stay Alive"  as "implausibly slight, but impressively groove-ridden".  In a review rated 7 out of 10, Uncut wrote: "Bolan, newly enchanted with singer Gloria Jones, gives fuller vent to funk and R&B influences, predating by several months Bowie’s and Elton John’s interest in disco and Philly soul." "Bolan was still clearly capable of inspired creativity – the dark, twisted “Explosive Mouth” and “Change” are particularly great". "The enjoyably sub-Dylan melodrama of “Teenage Dream”".  The Quietus praised most of the songs, saying: "'Venus Loon' and 'Sound Pit' are startling, fantastic openers, bustling with heavy-hitting proto-disco grooves and the kind of dramatic string-stabs more akin to the Chi-Lites or O'Jays than the purely rock & roll influences of yore. Even when he does step back to the boogie of 'Explosive Mouth' there's an almost Beefheartian oddity to the grooves and shapes, a committed surrealism to the lyrics, an honesty about his own self-delusion and the destructiveness of his fantasism that imply far more self-awareness than the official story of Bolan's demise allows." Reviewer Neil Kulkarni further said that tracks like "'Galaxy' and 'Teenage Dream' swim in exquisitely dreamy breaks and bridges", featuring "the sweetly soulful harmonies and ultra-phased fades". Musically, it is said that Bolan "blends soul with funk, acid-rock, rockabilly, adds it to his palette to create a uniquely twisted stew still all his own". "'Liquid Gang', 'Carsmile Smith' and 'Painless Persuasion' are some of the most gloriously over-the-edge anthems he ever wrote, and when the band gets funky ('You've Got To Jive', 'Interstellar Soul' and 'The Avengers') they manage to be more lethally in the pocket than any of the other white rockers then trying to tap a little of James Brown's ancient-futurist magic (e.g. Led Zep, the Stones). 'The Leopards' fades you out with Marc not even singing – rapping like a Dadaist Last-Poet/Watts-Prophet, tentatively but tantalisingly hitting on an almost entirely new-type of music, somewhere 'tween Kevin Ayers and Iceberg Slim." He concluded saying that Zinc Alloy was a "fantastic mess".The Guardian wrote that it is "better than its reputation suggests". Reviewer Alexis Petridis qualified "Teenage Dream" as "floridly elegiac" "and sufficiently ahead of the curve to start experimenting with soul music 18 months before Bowie released Young Americans". Petridis concluded that Bolan "was aiming for a sort of Spectoresque wall-of-sound effect and slightly missing the mark". Record Collector dubbed it a "reMarcable musical fusion".

Legacy
AllMusic wrote that Zinc Alloy'' predated the change of style of Bolan's peers, saying: "soul-soaked songs like these aren't simply a new direction. They are the very signposts which would soon be guiding so many other English rock talents down some very unfamiliar alleyways. Zinc Alloy was released in March, 1974. Bowie began rehearsing his Philly Dogs tour in July".

Track listing

Personnel
T.Rex
Marc Bolan – vocals, guitar, producer 
Mickey Finn – percussion
Bill Legend – drums
Steve Currie – bass
with:
Danny Thompson – double bass
B.J. Cole – steel guitar
Jack Green – guitar
Lonnie Jordan – keyboards
The Cosmic Choir: Big Richard, Gloria Jones, Sister Pat Hall – backing vocals
Tony Visconti - production, mixing, string arrangements, mellotron

Charts

References

External links 

 

1974 albums
Albums produced by Tony Visconti
T. Rex (band) albums
EMI Records albums